The 2003 UEFA European Under-17 Championship was the second edition of UEFA's UEFA European Under-17 Championship. Portugal hosted the championship, during 7–17 May. The format of the competition changed, and only 8 teams entered the competition. Host Portugal defeated Spain in the final to win the competition for the fifth time.

For winning their semifinals, Portugal and Spain qualified for the 2003 FIFA U-17 World Championship, held in Finland, with England and Austria missing out.

Qualification 

Qualification for the final tournament of the 2003 UEFA European Under-17 Championship consisted of two rounds: a Qualifying round and an Elite round. In the qualifying round, 44 national teams competed in 11 groups of four teams, with two best teams of each group advancing to the elite round. There, the 22 first-round qualifiers plus the teams who were given a bye (Spain, England, Russia, Finland, Poland and Hungary), were distributed in seven groups of four teams. The winner of each group qualified for the final tournament.

Qualified teams 
The following 8 teams qualified for the final tournament.

Note: All appearance statistics include only U-17 era (since 2002).

Venues 
The final tournament was played in seven venues located in seven different cities, Viseu, Nelas, Chaves, Mangualde, Vila Real, Santa Comba Dão and Santa Marta de Penaguião. The Estádio do Fontelo was the largest stadium with a tournament capacity of 12,000 seats, and served as both the opening ceremony and the final venue.

The table below lists stadium capacity for the final tournament, which may not correspond to their effective maximum capacity.

Squads 

Each participating national association had to submit a final list of 18 players (three of whom must be goalkeepers). All players must have been born on or after 1 January 1986.

Match Officials 
A total of 6 referees, 8 assistant referees and 2 fourth officials were appointed for the final tournament.

Referees
  Damir Skomina
  Sergiy Berezka
  Veaceslav Banari
  Stefan Johannesson
  Novo Panic
  Kuddusi Müftüoglu

Assistant referees
  David Paul Todd
  Gianpietro Lucca
  Dimitrios Bozatzidis
  Ingmar Spiteri
  Roman Slysko
  Tomislav Petrovic
  Arie Brink
  Tihon Kalugin

Fourth officials
  Pedro Proenca Oliveira Alves Garcia
  Joaquim Paulo Paraty Da Silva

Group stage

Group A

Group B

Knockout stage

Knockout map

Semifinals

Third Place Playoff

Final

Goalscorers 

6 goals
  David Rodríguez
3 goals
  James Milner
  José Cases
2 goals

  Mads Torry
  Dean Bowditch
  Arturo Lupoli
  Nicola Pozzi
  Manuel Curto
  Márcio Sousa
  Vieirinha
  Xisco Nadal

1 goal

  Christian Fuchs
  Daniel Horvath
  Patrick Mayer
  Daniel Pirker
  Christoph Saurer
  Marko Stanković
  Michael Jakobsen
  Bo Storm
  Steven Taylor
  Lior Refaelov
  Bruno Gama
  João Pedro
  Paulo Machado
  Carlos Saleiro
  Jurado
  David Silva

References

External links 
 UEFA.com
 RSSSF.com

 
UEFA
UEFA European Under-17 Championship
International association football competitions hosted by Portugal
UEFA
May 2003 sports events in Europe
2003 in youth association football